Sierpe River (Spanish: Rio Sierpe) is a river of Costa Rica.  Boat traffic is common with both locals and tourists.  A broad range of wildlife can be seen from the American Crocodile, various other reptile species, and exotic fish and birds. It joins the Rio Terraba.

References

Rivers of Costa Rica
Ramsar sites in Costa Rica